Samuel Eyde (29 October 1866 – 21 June 1940) was a Norwegian engineer and industrialist. He was the founder of both Norsk Hydro and Elkem.

Personal life
Eyde was born in Arendal in Aust-Agder, Norway. He was a son of ship-owner Samuel Eyde (1819–1902) and his wife Elina Christine Amalie Stephansen (1829–1906). He was a first cousin of Alf Scott-Hansen on the maternal side.

In August 1895 he married Countess Ulla Mörner (1873–1961), but the marriage was dissolved in 1912. In February 1913 he married actress Elly Simonsen (1885–1960).

Career
Eyde studied engineering in Berlin where he graduated in 1891. He started his career in Hamburg, working with the railways where he planned new lines, bridges and stations. In 1897 he started the engineering firm Gleim & Eyde with his previous boss from Hamburg. He soon established offices in Kristiania (now Oslo) and Stockholm. By the turn of the century the firm was one of the largest in Scandinavia, with some 30 engineers.

In 1902, Eyde acquired control over Rjukan Falls in Telemark. He also held rights to waterfalls at Arendal and Notodden. Eyde planned to use the hydropower for industrial purposes. In 1905 Rjukan Falls was producing hydro electrical power for Potassium nitrate production. This led to the development of the town of Rjukan as an industrial centre. In 1912 Eyde contributed to the development of Arendal Smelteverk at Eydehavn for the production of silicon carbide. The plant is now part of the Norwegian company Fiven ASA and one of the oldest silicon carbide producing plants worldwide.

In 1903, Eyde met with Kristian Birkeland, who was a scientist, inventor and professor of physics at the University of Christiania. Birkeland was working on developing an electric arc, while Eyde had recently bought the rights to several waterfalls in Telemark. They agreed to cooperate to develop an electric flame. This allowed Eyde to establish Det Norske Aktieselskap for Eletrokemisk Industri (today Elkem) along with members of the Wallenberg family who he had met in Sweden. The factory at Notodden opening on 2 May 1905.

In 1905 he founded Norsk Hydro-Elektrisk Kvælstofaktieselskab (now Norsk Hydro). Eyde remained director-general of both companies. He was director-general of Norsk Hydro until 1917.

He was a member of the Norwegian Parliament in the period 1918–1920. In 1920, Eyde was appointed as Norwegian Minister to the United States.

Gallery

See also
 Birkeland–Eyde process

References

Other sources
 Grimnes, Ole Kristian (2001) Sam Eyde: den grenseløse gründer (Oslo: Aschehoug)

External links
Norsk Hydro ASA website
Elkem AS website

1866 births
1940 deaths
People from Arendal
People from Rjukan
Norwegian expatriates in Germany
Norwegian company founders
Norwegian industrialists
Norsk Hydro people
Norwegian engineers
Norwegian diplomats
Norwegian expatriates in the United States
Norwegian Army personnel
Commanders of the Order of the Dannebrog
Commanders of the Order of the Sword
BASF people